Ernst Johannes Fritz Thälmann (16 April 1886 – 18 August 1944) was a German communist politician, and leader of the Communist Party of Germany (KPD) from 1925 to 1933.

A committed Marxist-Leninist and Stalinist, Thälmann played a major role during the political instability of the Weimar Republic, especially in its final years, when the KPD explicitly sought to overthrow the liberal democracy of the republic. Under his leadership the KPD became intimately associated with the government of the Soviet Union and the policies of Joseph Stalin. The KPD under Thälmann's leadership regarded the Social Democratic Party (SPD) as its main adversary and the party adopted the position that the social democrats were "social fascists".

Thälmann was also leader of the paramilitary Roter Frontkämpferbund. He was arrested by the Gestapo in 1933 and held in solitary confinement for eleven years; for political reasons, Stalin did not seek his release after the Molotov–Ribbentrop Pact with Germany, and Thälmann's party rival Walter Ulbricht ignored requests to plead on his behalf. Thälmann was shot on Adolf Hitler's personal orders in Buchenwald in 1944.

Family and early years 
Ernst Thälmann's parents, Johannes Thälmann (called 'Jan'; 11 April 1857, Weddern (Holstein)  – 31 October 1933), a farmworker, and Mary-Magdalene (née Kohpeiss; 8 November 1857, Kirchwerder – 9 March 1927) married in 1884 in Hamburg. Ernst's parents had no party affiliation; in contrast to his father, his mother was deeply religious.

After Ernst's birth, his parents took over a pub near the Port of Hamburg. On 4 April 1887, his sister Frieda was born (died 8 July 1967 in Hamburg). In March 1892, Thälmann's parents were convicted and sentenced to two years in prison because they had fenced stolen goods or had taken them for debt payment. Ernst and Frieda were placed in separate foster families. Thälmann's parents were released early; his mother in May, and his father in October 1893. His parents' offense was used 36 years later in the campaign against Ernst Thälmann.

From 1893 to 1900, Thälmann attended elementary school. He later described history, natural history, folklore, mathematics, gymnastics and sports as his favorite subjects. However, he did not like religion. In the mid-1890s, his parents opened a vegetable, coal and wagon shop in Eilbek, a suburb of Hamburg. The young Ernst worked in the business after school and did his schoolwork in the morning before classes started. Despite this burden, Thälmann was a good student who enjoyed learning. He wanted to become a teacher or to learn a trade, but his parents refused to lend him financial support. He had to continue working in his parents' business, causing much sorrow and conflict with his parents. Therefore, he sought a job as an unskilled worker in the port. Here the ten-year-old Thälmann came in contact with the port workers on strike from November 1896 till February 1897 in the bitter labor dispute known as the Hamburg Docker's Strike 1896/97.

Leaving home; World War I; desertion 
At the beginning of 1902, he left home. He first lived in an emergency shelter, later in a basement apartment, and in 1904 he was fireman on the steam-powered freight ship AMERIKA which also traveled to the USA. He was a Social Democratic Party member during 1903. On 1 February 1904, he joined the Central Union of Trade, transport and traffic workers of Germany and ascended to the chairman of the 'Department carters'. In 1913, he supported a call of Rosa Luxemburg for a mass strike as a means of action of the SPD to enforce political demands. From 1913 to 1914, he worked for a laundry as a coachman.

In January 1915, one day before he was called up for military service in World War I, he married Rosa Koch. He was posted to the artillery on the western front, where he stayed till the end of the war,  taking part in the Battle of Champagne (1915–1916), the Battle of the Somme (1916), the Battle of Arras (1917), the Second Battle of the Aisne (1917), the Battle of Cambrai (1917), and the Battle of Soissons (1918). For his service, Thälmann received the Iron cross Second Class, the Hanseatic Cross and Wound Badge (twice).

Towards the end of 1917, he became a member of the Independent Social Democratic Party of Germany (USPD). In late October 1918, while on home leave from the front, Thälmann deserted together with four fellow soldiers. On 9 November 1918, he wrote in his diary on the Western Front, "...did a bunk from the Front with 4 comrades at 2 o'clock."

Kommunistische Partei Deutschlands (KPD) 

After his desertion, he was active in the German Revolution in Hamburg that began on 29 October 1918. From March 1919, he was chairman of the USPD in Hamburg, a member of the Hamburg Parliament, and worked as a relief worker in the Hamburg city park before taking up a well-paying job at the employment office. There, he rose to the rank of Inspector.

When the USPD split over the question whether to join the Communist International (Comintern), Thälmann sided with the pro-Communist faction which merged with the KPD in November 1920, and in the following December Thälmann was elected to the KPD's Central Committee. In March 1921 he was fired from his job at the employment office due to his political activities. That summer Thälmann was a representative of the KPD to the  Congress of the Comintern in Moscow and met Vladimir Lenin personally. In June 1922, terrorists from the ultranationalist group Organisation Consul threw a hand grenade into his ground floor flat, but the assassination attempt failed and he survived.

Thälmann helped to organise the Hamburg Uprising of October 1923—it failed, however, and Thälmann was forced to go in hiding. After Lenin's death in late January 1924, Thälmann visited Moscow and maintained a guard of honour at his bier. From February 1924 he was deputy chairman of the KPD and, from May, a Reichstag member. At the 5th Congress of the Comintern in July 1924 he was elected to the Comintern executive committee and a short time later to its steering committee. In February 1925 he became chairman of the KPD's paramilitary organisation, the Roter Frontkämpferbund (RFB) (although this organisation was banned by the governing social democrats in 1929, after the events of Blutmai ("Bloody May", see below)). In October 1925 Thälmann became chairman of the KPD and thus a candidate for the German Presidency. Thälmann's candidacy in the second round of the presidential election split the centre-left vote, ensuring that the conservative Paul von Hindenburg defeated the Centre Party's Wilhelm Marx.

In October 1926 Thälmann supported the dockers' strike in his home town of Hamburg. He saw this as an act of solidarity with the British miners' strike which had started on 1 May, although that strike had been profitable for the Hamburg Docks as an alternative supplier of coal. In 1928 during the Wittorf affair he was ousted from the party central committee for trying to cover up embezzlement by John Wittorf, a party official and protégé (and a close friend) of Thälmann. However, Stalin intervened and had Thälmann reinstated, signalling the beginning of a purge and completing the "Stalinization" of the KPD.

KPD vs. SPD 

After the Revolution of 1918, during the Spartacist uprising the government ordered the massacre of Spartacists and execution of KPD leaders Rosa Luxemburg and Karl Liebknecht.  The same year the German Army under orders of the SPD-led republic government used military forced against the Bavarian Soviet Republic. In 1920, there was a fierce suppression of the uprising in the Ruhr.

At the 12th party congress of the KPD in June 1929 in Berlin-Wedding, Thälmann adopted a policy of confrontation with the SPD. This followed the events of "Bloody May", in which 32 people were killed by the police in an attempt to suppress demonstrations which had been banned by the Interior Minister, Carl Severing, a Social Democrat.

Thälmann's KPD thus fought the SPD as their main political enemy, acting according to the Comintern policy which declared Social Democrats to be "social fascists". This made it difficult for the two leftist parties to work together against the emergence of Adolf Hitler. The KPD under Thälmann declared that "fighting fascism means fighting the SPD just as much as it means fighting Hitler and the parties of Brüning." Thälmann declared in December 1931 that "some Nazi trees must not be allowed to overshadow a forest" of social democrats. By 1927, Karl Kilbom, the Comintern representative to Germany, had started to combat this ultra-leftist tendency within the German Communist Party, but found Stalin machinating against his efforts.

In March 1932, Thälmann was once again a candidate for the German Presidency, against the incumbent Paul von Hindenburg and Hitler. The KPD's slogan was "A vote for Hindenburg is a vote for Hitler; a vote for Hitler is a vote for war." Thälmann returned as a candidate in the second round of the election, as it was permitted by the German electoral law, but his vote count lessened from 4,983,000 (13.2%), in the first round, to 3,707,000 (10.2%).

After the National Socialists came to power in January 1933, Thälmann proposed that the SPD and KPD should organise a general strike to topple National Socialist rule, this was rejected by the SPD, who didn't want to work with the KPD after the long years of Thälmann and the KPD's policy of "social fascism". In February 1933, a Central Committee meeting of the then already banned KPD took place at the "Sporthaus Ziegenhals" in Königs Wusterhausen, near Berlin, where Thälmann had called for the violent overthrow of Hitler's government. (The Comintern's guidelines on social democracy as "social fascism" remained in force until 1935 when the Comintern officially switched to endorsing a "popular front" of socialists, liberals and even conservatives against the National Socialist threat—an attempt to win over the leftist elements of the NSDAP, especially the SA, who largely came from a working-class background and supported socialist economic policies. By that time, however, Hitler and the National Socialists had risen to power and the KPD had been largely destroyed.)

After the Reichstag Fire on 27 February 1933, the National Socialist regime targeted members of the KPD and other left-wing opponents of it in a new wave of violence and arrests; although having gone underground yet again, Thälmann was arrested and imprisoned together with his personal secretary Werner Hirsch on 3 March 1933.

Imprisonment and execution 
On the afternoon of 3 March 1933, eight officers of Police Station 121 arrested Thälmann at his self-appointed safehouse, the home of Hans and Martha Kluczynski in Berlin-Charlottenburg. Although the main police informant was a neighbor of the Kluczynskis, Hermann Hilliges, at least four other people informed the police of the connection between the Kluczynskis and Thälmann in the days before the latter's arrest. Thälmann had used the Kluczynskis' home occasionally for several years, but started fully residing there in January 1933. Although it was not among the six illegal residences that the military-political apparatus of the KPD had prepared for Thälmann, it was not considered known to the police.

During imprisonment, Thälmann managed to smuggle out detailed descriptions of his treatment in writing: "They ordered me to take off my pants and then two men grabbed me by the back of the neck and placed me across a footstool. A uniformed Gestapo officer with a whip of hippopotamus hide in his hand then beat my buttocks with measured strokes. Driven wild with pain I repeatedly screamed at the top of my lungs. Then they held my mouth shut for a while and hit me in the face, and with a whip across the chest and back. I then collapsed, rolled on the floor, always kept my face down and no longer replied to any of their questions."

After the German–Soviet Non-Aggression Pact and Germany's and Soviet Union's joint invasion of Poland — and despite Thälmann's loyalty to Stalin during his time leading the KPD — Moscow pragmatically removed a slogan for the 1939 International Youth Day which read in part, "Long live Comrade Thälmann!" and replaced it with, "Long live the wise foreign policy of the Soviet Union, guided by Comrade Stalin's instructions." As it turned out, Thälmann's long-time party rival Walter Ulbricht had ignored several requests for help from Thälmann's family when the thawing in German–Soviet relations could have made a release possible, preferring to let Thälmann remain imprisoned. Fellow German Communist, Wilhelm Pieck had managed to escape to the Soviet Union and in July 1936 he issued a statement calling for the release of Thälmann: "If we succeeded in raising a tremendous storm of protest throughout the world, it will be possible to break down the prison walls and as in the case of Dimitrov, deliver Thälmann from the clutches of the Fascist hangmen. The fact that Ernst Thälmann has got to spend his fiftieth birthday in the gaols of Hitler-Fascism is an urgent reminder to all the anti-Fascists of the whole world that they must intensify to the utmost their campaign for the release of Thälmann and the many thousands of imprisoned victims of the White Terror." However, these attempts at raising publicity for his plight were in vain; during the 1930s, numerous German communists who had been close to Thälmann had been murdered in Stalin's camps.

Thälmann spent over eleven years in solitary confinement. In August 1944, he was transferred from Bautzen prison to Buchenwald concentration camp, where he was shot on 18 August on Hitler's personal order. His body was immediately cremated.  Shortly after, the Nazis claimed in an announcement that, together with Rudolf Breitscheid, Thälmann had died in an Allied bombing attack on 23 August.

Legacy 

During the Spanish Civil War, several units of German republican volunteers (most notably the Thälmann Battalion of the International Brigades) were named in his honour. During World War II, Yugoslavia's leader Tito organized a company of Danube Swabians and Wehrmacht defectors as the Ernst Thälmann Company to fight the German enemy.

In 1935, the former town of Ostheim in Ukraine was renamed Telmanove (Donetsk Oblast).

After 1945, Thälmann and other leading communists who had been murdered, such as Rosa Luxemburg and Karl Liebknecht, were widely honoured in East Germany, with many schools, streets, factories and the like named after them. Many of these names were changed after German reunification, but streets and squares named after Thälmann remain in Berlin, Hamburg, Greifswald and Frankfurt an der Oder. The East German pioneer organisation was named the Ernst Thälmann Pioneer Organisation in his memory. Members pledged that "Ernst Thälmann is my role model ... I promise to learn to work and fight [struggle] as Ernst Thälmann teaches".

In the 1950s, a two-part East German film, Ernst Thälmann, was produced. In 1972, Cuba named a small island, Cayo Ernesto Thaelmann, after him.

One of the main traffic arteries of Soviet Riga was named Ernsta Tēlmaņa iela after him on completion in 1981; however, soon after Latvia had regained independence in 1991 it was renamed Kārļa Ulmaņa gatve, after pre-World War II prime minister Kārlis Ulmanis.

In Ho Chi Minh City, a highschool, THPT Ernst Thalmann (Ten Lơ Man) was named after him.

In Ulaanbaatar, Mongolia, a primary school's namesake was given after Ernst Thälmann, which is still in operation.

The British Communist composer and activist Cornelius Cardew named his Thälmann Variations for piano in Thälmann's memory.

The VEB Ernst Thälmann Waffenfabrik, an East German weapons factory in Suhl (formerly Simson), was named after Thälmann (until 1990).

Writings (selection)

See also
 Ernst Thälmann Island

References

Sources 
Biography of Ernst Thälmann  on the website of the Deutsches Historisches Museum

Further reading
 
 LaPorte, N. (Ed.), & Morgan, K. (2008) 'Kings among their subjects'? Ernst Thälmann, Harry Pollitt and the leadership cult as Stalinization. In N. LaPorte, K. Morgan, & M. Worley (Eds.), Bolshevism, Stalinism and the Comintern: Perspectives on Stalinization, 1917–53 (pp. 124–145). Palgrave Macmillan Ltd. https://doi.org/10.1057/9780230227583_7

External links 

 Discourses and writings by and about Ernst Thälmann, on the Marxists Internet Archive. 
 Ernst Thälmann Memorial in Hamburg, Germany 
 German song about Ernst Thälmann with DDR film footage
 

1886 births
1944 deaths
Stalinism
Anti-revisionists
People from Hamburg executed in Nazi concentration camps
Social Democratic Party of Germany politicians
Independent Social Democratic Party politicians
Communist Party of Germany politicians
Members of the Reichstag of the Weimar Republic
Rotfrontkämpferbund members
German people who died in Buchenwald concentration camp
Candidates for President of Germany
German communists
German Marxists
German anti-fascists
Politicians who died in Nazi concentration camps
German revolutionaries
German civilians killed in World War II
People executed by Nazi Germany by firearm
Executed communists